Daniel Edward Antonucci (born February 27, 1957) is a Canadian animator, director, producer, and writer. Antonucci is known for creating the Cartoon Network animated comedy series Ed, Edd n Eddy. He also created Lupo the Butcher, Cartoon Sushi, and The Brothers Grunt.

Danny Antonucci dropped out of the Sheridan College of Visual Arts to take a job as an animator at Hanna-Barbera, where he worked on a number of series, including Fables of the Green Forest, The Flintstone Comedy Show, Scooby-Doo and Scrappy-Doo, The Smurfs, and Richie Rich. He continued his career in Vancouver, where he worked on animated shorts and television commercials for International Rocketship Limited, and created his first solo work, the animated short Lupo the Butcher. At MTV, he worked on a number of commercials, his series The Brothers Grunt, and the animation showcase program Cartoon Sushi, which he co-created with Keith Alcorn. He went on to create Ed, Edd n Eddy for Cartoon Network. In 2008, Antonucci signed to WildBrain.

Throughout his career, Antonucci won a number of awards. Many of his commercials for Converse, ESPN and Levi's won a number of awards. Lupo the Butcher was a successful short and is considered to be a cult classic.

Early life
Antonucci's parents were Italian immigrants to Canada. His experiences as a child in an immigrant family deeply influenced his later work, such as Lupo the Butcher.

Antonucci attended the Sheridan College of Visual Arts but quit to take a job as an animator at Canimage Production, a division of Hanna-Barbera.

Career
Starting his career as an animator, Antonucci worked on numerous shows, including The Flintstone Comedy Show, Scooby-Doo and Scrappy-Doo, The Smurfs, and Richie Rich.

Intending to move to Los Angeles in 1984 to find more work, Antonucci landed in Vancouver, British Columbia. He landed a job at International Rocketship Limited, animating short films and television commercials. His first effort was on the short film Hooray for Sandbox Land.

International Rocketship Limited, foundation of a.k.a. Cartoon, and MTV work
Antonucci's first solo work was Lupo the Butcher, produced by International Rocketship Limited, about a short-tempered butcher who swears at the meat he is cutting and gets extremely mad at the smallest mistakes. Antonucci explains the short arose out of his own frustration at having to work in children's film for so long, and to try his hand at creating a full-fledged character on film. The short animated film screened at several film festivals, including Spike and Mike's Sick and Twisted Festival of Animation in the United States.

The 'Lupo' character was eventually licensed by the Converse athletic shoe company. This led to additional work, including animated commercials for Levi Strauss & Co. and MTV. He also originally created a mascot for Cartoon Network, known as the jester, as well as the mascot's bumpers.

On April 1, 1994, Antonucci started an animation company named a.k.a. Cartoon, which produced the short-lived MTV series The Brothers Grunt, which began airing in 1994 and ended its run in 1995. Antonucci went on to work on MTV's Cartoon Sushi show in 1997, directing, writing and providing voices, in addition to being responsible for the title sequence of the show.

Ed, Edd n Eddy

Feeling confined to "gross" and "edgy" work, such as his series The Brothers Grunt, Antonucci decided to produce an animated children's television show again with his company a.k.a. Cartoon. He resolved, however, to ensure that the series was produced in a way similar to the cartoon styles from the 1940s to the 1970s. Antonucci spent months designing the show, before trying to sell it to Nickelodeon. Nickelodeon told him that they would take the show, if they also obtained creative control. Antonucci refused to give it, and instead took the show to Cartoon Network. A deal was ultimately made for Cartoon Network to commission the show, after they agreed to let Antonucci go in his own direction.

Antonucci is a strong advocate of hand-drawn animation. The wobbling animation in Ed, Edd n Eddy is an homage to the hand-drawn cartoons with a style that harkens back to cartoons of the 1940s to the 1970s. To give the impression of movement, Ed, Edd n Eddy uses shimmering character outlines similar to Squigglevision. The crawling lines are not nearly as active as those in Dr. Katz, Professional Therapist, but are still visible, and Antonucci likens it to cartoons of the 1930s.

According to Antonucci, the characters were based on real people in his life. The personalities of Ed, Edd, and Eddy are based on personal traits of himself, and the activities of his two sons. The Eds also possess personality traits similar to The Three Stooges, whose money-making schemes and antics also invariably backfire. The cul-de-sac children and the Kanker Sisters were all based on children he grew up with. Antonucci also stated that he believed it was important to add Plank, a board of wood, to the show, stating that he "thought it would be really cool to do the show with Plank taking on a character of his own" and to cause Jonny to do things he would usually never do. He also stated that Rolf is strongly based on himself and his cousins, since he was part of an immigrant family, and grew up in a first-generation foreign household with different customs and ways of living.

Ed, Edd n Eddy is the only a.k.a. Cartoon show to have a movie based on the animated television series. The series' finale movie, Ed, Edd n Eddy's Big Picture Show, aired on November 8, 2009, officially ending the series.

WildBrain and upcoming series
While Antonucci was working on Ed, Edd n Eddy's Big Picture Show, it was announced on September 4, 2008 that he signed to WildBrain; Antonucci stated that he was "already kicking around three different ideas for his first WildBrain project". On June 11, 2013, US animator Joe Murray posted a short interview with Antonucci for his class on his website, and on the end wrote: "He's currently working on a new series, so rock on." In November 2020, Antonucci confirmed a series based on Lupo the Butcher was in development for release on Netflix which got canceled due to creative differences between Antonucci and Netflix.

Awards and nominations
Antonucci's first solo work Lupo the Butcher was a successful short and is considered to be a cult classic. Eric Fogel, creator of Celebrity Deathmatch, stated that Lupo the Butcher "opened [his] eyes to a world of animation that was strictly for grownups and inspired [him] to pursue a career path that was a bit more... twisted". Throughout his career, Antonucci received a number of awards. He worked on a number of award-winning commercials for Converse, ESPN and Levi's. In 1998, for his work on Cartoon Sushi, Antonucci received a National Cartoonists Society Division Award for Television Animation. Ed, Edd n Eddy received various awards and nominations; for his work on the series, he won a Reuben Award for Best Television Animation in 1999 and a Leo Award for Best Director in an Animated Production or Series in 2000. With an almost 11-year run, it remains the longest running original Cartoon Network series and Canadian-made animated series to date. It was also Cartoon Network's most popular series among boys ages 2–11. Bob Higgins, head of WildBrain, considered Ed, Edd n Eddy to be a "landmark in animation". Joe Murray, famous for creating the animated series Rocko's Modern Life and Camp Lazlo, called Antonucci "one of the founders and mainstays of modern animation".

Filmography

Films

Television

Personal life
Antonucci has two children named Tex and Marlowe who were named after animator Tex Avery and the fictional character Philip Marlowe respectively.

References

External links
 

 
1957 births
Artists from Toronto
Canadian animated film directors
Canadian animated film producers
Canadian humorists
Canadian people of Italian descent
Canadian male television writers
Canadian male voice actors
Canadian storyboard artists
Canadian television directors
Canadian television producers
Canadian television writers
Cartoon Network Studios people
Film directors from Toronto
Hanna-Barbera people
Living people
Male actors from Toronto
Reuben Award winners
Sheridan College animation program alumni
Showrunners
Writers from Toronto